Baryancistrus hadrostomus is a species of catfish in the family Loricariidae. It is native to South America, where it occurs in the Jari River basin. The species was described in 2019 by Renildo Ribeiro de Oliveira, Lúcia Rapp Py-Daniel, and Osvaldo Takeshi Oyakawa alongside the species Baryancistrus micropunctatus on the basis of coloration and other characteristics. Its color pattern is noted to be unique when compared with its congeners.

References 

Loricariidae
Fauna of Brazil
Fish described in 2019